Sitakunda or Sitakunda Town is an administrative centre and the sole municipality (Paurashava) of Sitakunda Upazila in Chattogram District, located in Chattogram Division, Bangladesh. Sitakunda is famous for the Chandranath Temple and Hindus temple. There is a hot water spring 5 km to the north of the town.

Administration
The Sitakunda town has 9 wards divided into 22 mahallas, and a population of 36,650 distributed to 6,914 units of households (average household size 5.3), including 18,662 men and 17,988 women (the male:female ratio is 104:100).
 The most notable mahallas of the town are Yakubnagar, Nunachara, Mohadebpur, Sobanbagh, Bhuiyan Para, Chowdhury Para (also known as Premtala), Moulvi Para, Amirabad, Edilpur and Shibpur.

Shafiul Alam is the mayor of the town, gaining a landslide win over his nearest contender M Abul Kalam Azad in the 2008 mayoral election.

History
To reduce the population pressure on Chittagong, Sitakunda has been developed as a satellite town of the city, as well as a zone selected for industrial development along with Bhatiari. The municipality is growing fast as an urban center, especially in and around Sitakunda and Mahadebpur mouzas where the Office of the Upazila Nirbahi Officer and other major Government offices, boys' high school and college are, but public services and facilities like electricity, drinking water, drainage and garbage disposal are under-provided.

Geography
The town, situated on an unbroken flat land of alluvial deposits that lies below the level of high tide, is free from tidal effects and flash floods of the area due to an embankment.

References

Populated places in Chittagong Division